Gilla Críst, Gille Críst, and Giolla Críost are masculine Gaelic personal names meaning "servant of Christ".

People with the name Gilla Críst
Gilla Críst Ua Máel Eóin (died 1127), Irish historian
Gilla Críst Ua Mocháin (fl. 1120s), Irish craftsman

People with the name Gille Críst
Gille Críst, Earl of Angus, Scottish magnate
Gille Críst, Earl of Menteith, Scottish magnate
Gille Críst, Earl of Mar, Scottish magnate

People with the name Giolla Críost
Giolla Críost Brúilingeach (fl. 1440), Scottish musician

See also
Gilchrist (surname), cognate surname
 Christian (given name)

Irish-language masculine given names